Castellavazzo is a comune (municipality) in the Province of Belluno in the Italian region of Veneto, located about  north of Venice and about  northeast of Belluno.

History

Vajont disaster 
On 9 October 1963 at 10:35 pm, heavy rainfall and the 3rd drawing of the Vajont Dam triggered a landslide. There was also damage caused by air being displaced from the wave. About 2,000 people were killed in the landslide and tsunami, but the main structure of the dam is still there, and many tourists come to see it.

Castellavazzo borders the following municipalities: Erto e Casso, Forno di Zoldo, Longarone, Ospitale di Cadore.

Demographic evolution

International relations

Twin towns / Sister cities 
  La Pobla de Segur, Spain

References

Cities and towns in Veneto